Molina de Aragón is a municipality located in the province of Guadalajara, Castile-La Mancha, Spain. According to the 2009 census (INE), the municipality had a population of 3,671 inhabitants. It holds the record (−28.2 °C) for the lowest temperature measured by a meteorological station in Spain.

It was the seat of the taifa of Molina, a Moorish independent state, before it was reconquered by the Christians of Alfonso I of Aragon in 1129. On 21 April 1154 Manrique Pérez de Lara issued a sweeping fuero to the town of Molina, which he was building into a semi-independent fief. He and his descendants claimed to rule Molina Dei gratia ("by the grace of God"). Molina is also the type location of the carbonate mineral aragonite.

Main sights

Medieval alcazar (10th–11th centuries), the largest in the province
Roman bridge (Puente Viejo)
Convent of St. Francis
Giraldo (St. Francis Church Bell Tower)
Church of Santa Clara
Church of Santa María de San Gil
Molina-Alto Tajo Geopark, Molina de Aragon is within this Geopark.

List of settlements in the municipality
 Anchuela del Pedregal
 Cubillejo de la Sierra
 Cubillejo del Sitio
 Novella
 Tordelpalo

Climate
Molina de Aragón has an atypical variety of the oceanic climate with semi-arid influences. Due to its irregular precipitation patterns the location does not fall into the clear mediterranean zones to the south-west or the semi-arid that is common in the region, with significant precipitation in the summer and very low in the winter.

Gallery

Notes 

Municipalities in the Province of Guadalajara